Jorge Kolle Cueto (April 20, 1930 – March 4, 2007, La Paz) was a Bolivian communist politician. Kolle was one of the founding members of the Communist Party of Bolivia in 1950. He held the position of First Secretary of the party and edited the central party organ, Unidad. He also had an influence in the miners and factory workers trade union movement. Kolle was a senator 1982–1985.

References

Members of the Senate of Bolivia
1930 births
2007 deaths
Communist Party of Bolivia politicians